Bache is a hamlet in Shropshire, England.

External links

Hamlets in Shropshire